Ray Cox may refer to:

 Ray Cox (performer) (1881–1957), American actress and vaudeville performer
 Ray Cox (gamer) (born 1983), gamer known for setting Xbox Gamerscore records